Antonina and Antoņina are feminine given names and nicknames.  It is a Bulgarian, Latin, Polish, Russian, and Ukrainian given name that is an alternate form of Antonia in use in Israel, Vietnam, Moldova, Bulgaria, Romania, Hungary, Slovakia, Czech Republic, Poland, Ukraine, Belarus, Lithuania, Latvia, Estonia, Georgia, Azerbaijan, Armenia, Russia, Mongolia, Kazakhstan, Kyrgyzstan, Uzbekistan, Turkmenistan, and Tajikistan. It is a Danish, Finnish, German, Italian, Norwegian and Swedish diminutive form of Antonia in use in Greenland, Finland, Norway, Sweden, Denmark, parts of the Republic of Karelia, Germany, Italy, Northern Estonia, Austria, eastern Switzerland, and parts of Romania and Hungary. Antoņina is a Latvian alternate form of Antonia in use in Latvia. Notable people with this name include the following:

Given name

Arts
Antonina Houbraken (1686 – 1736), Dutch draughtswoman
Antonina Koptiaeva (1909 - 1991), Soviet novelist
Antonina Kymytval (1938 - 2015), Russian writer
Antonina Liedtke, Polish writer
Antonina Niemiryczowa (1702–1780), Polish poet
Antonina Riasanovsky (1895 – 1985), Russian author
Antonina Rzhevskaya (1861 – 1934), Russian painter
Antonina Żabińska (1908 – 1971), was a Polish writer

Entertainment
Antonina Abarinova (1842 – 1901), Russian opera singer 
Antonina Girycz (born 1939), Polish actress
Antonina Hoffmann (1842 – 1897), Polish theatre actress
Antonina Krzysztoń (born 1954), Polish singer-songwriter
Antonina Matviyenko (born 1981), Ukrainian singer
Antonina Miliukova (1848 – 1917), wife of Russian composer Pyotr Ilyich Tchaikovsky
Antonina Nezhdanova (1873 – 1950), Russian opera singer
Antonina Prusinowska (fl. 1767), Polish stage actress
Antonina Shuranova (1936 – 2003), Russian actress
Antonina Szumowska, birthname of Antoinette Szumowska (1868 — 1938), Polish pianist

Military/War
Antonina Khudyakova (1917 – 1998), Soviet Air Force officer
Antonina Lebedeva (1916 – 1943), Soviet Air Force officer
Antonina Makarova (1921 – 1979), Soviet war criminal
Antonina Petrova (1915 – 1941), Soviet partisan and medic
Antonina Tomaszewska (1814 – 1883), Polish noblewoman and rebel
Antonina Wyrzykowska (1916 – 2011), Polish Righteous Among the Nations honoree
Antonina Zubkova (1920 – 1950), Soviet Air Force officer

Politics
Antonina Kravchuk (born 1935), Ukrainian First Lady
Antonina Stoyanova (born 1952), Bulgarian IP lawyer, diplomat and social activist, who was the Bulgarian First Lady 
Antonina Uccello (1922–2023), American politician

Science
Antonina Borissova (1903 – 1970), Russian botanist
Antonina Dvoryanets (1952 – 2014), Ukrainian hydraulic engineer and political activist
Antonina Pirozhkova (1909 – 2010), Russian civil engineer
Antonina Pojarkova (1897 – 1980), Russian botanist
Antonina Prikhot'ko (1906 – 1995), Russian physicist

Sports
Antonina Dragašević (born 1948), Bulgarian chess player
Antonina Dubinina (born 1996), Serbian figure skater
Antonina Ivanova (1932 – 2006), Soviet shot putter
Antonina Koshel (born 1954), Soviet artistic gymnast
Antonina Krivoshapka (born 1987), Russian middle-distance athlete
Antonina Latinik-Rieger (1906 – 1989), Polish fencer
Antonina Lazareva (born 1941), Soviet high jump athlete
Antonina Melnikova (born 1958), Belarusian canoer 
Antonina Nastoburko (born 1959), Ukrainian sprint athlete
Antonina Ordina (born 1962), Swedish cross country skier
Antonina Popova (born 1935), Soviet discus athlete
Antonina Pustovit (born 1955), Ukrainian former rower
Antonina Rubtsova (born 1984), Kazakhstani volleyball player
Antonina Rudenko (born 1950), Soviet swimmer
Antonina Ryzhova (born 1934), Soviet volleyball player
Antonina Seredina (1929 – 2016), Russian sprint canoeist
Antonina Shevchenko (born 1984), Kyrgyzstani Muay Thai fighter and mixed martial artist
Antonina Skorobogatchenko (born 1999), Russian handballer
Antonina Yefremova (born 1981), Ukrainian middle-distance athlete
Antonina Zelikovich (born 1958), Russian rower
Antonina Zetova (born 1973), Bulgarian volleyball player

Other
Antonina (wife of Belisarius) (c. 495 – after 565), Byzantine patrikia and wife of Belisarius
Antonina Bludova (1813 – 1891), Russian philanthropist and lady-in-waiting
Antonina W. Bouis, American translator
Blessed Antonina De Angelis (1880 – 1962), Italian Roman Catholic
Antonina Kłoskowska (1919 – 2001), Polish sociologist
Antonina Roxa (c. 1807 – 1869), Falkland Island colonist
Saint Antonina of Antonina and Alexander (died 313), Roman martyr

Middle name
Hanna Antonina Wojcik Slak (born 1975), Polish-born Slovenian film director and screenwriter
Blessed Maria Antonina Kratochwil (1881 – 1942), Austro-Hungarian Catholic saint
Rachel Fanny Antonina Lee (1770s – 1829), British kidnap victim

See also

Antonia (name)
Antonida Asonova
Antonija
Antonin (name)
Antonine (name)
Antonini (name)
Antonino (name)
Antoniny (disambiguation)
Antoñita (disambiguation)
Antoniya

Notes

Bulgarian feminine given names
Danish feminine given names
Finnish feminine given names
German feminine given names
Italian feminine given names
Latin feminine given names
Latvian feminine given names
Norwegian feminine given names
Polish feminine given names
Russian feminine given names
Swedish feminine given names
Ukrainian feminine given names